The culture of Japan has changed greatly over the millennia, from the country's prehistoric Jōmon period, to its contemporary modern culture, which absorbs influences from Asia and other regions of the world.

Historical overview

The ancestry of Japanese people remains mysterious; however, there are two competing hypotheses that try to explain the lineage of the Japanese people.

The first hypothesis proposes a dual-structure model, in which Japanese populations are descendants of the indigenous Jomon people and later arrivals of people from the East Eurasian continent, known as the Yayoi people. Japan's indigenous culture originates primarily from the Yayoi people who settled in Japan between 1000 BCE and 300 CE. Yayoi culture spread to the main island of Honshū, mixing with the native Jōmon culture. Modern Japanese have an estimated 80% Yayoi and 20% Jōmon ancestry.

The second hypothesis posits a tripartite model of genomic origin. This hypothesis proposes that contemporary Japanese people are from three distinct ancestral groups: Jomon, Yayoi and Kofun, with 13%, 16% and 71% of genetic ancestry, respectively. During the Kofun period, it is said that migrant groups from China came to Japan and settled on the island, bringing with them various cultural advances and centralized leadership. The migrants who came to Japan during the Kofun period appear to have had ancestry that mainly resembles the ancestry of the Han Chinese population of China. The Jomon people were hunter-gathers; the Yayoi people introduced rice cultivation; and the Kofun migrants introduced imperial state formation.

Japanese culture was influenced from ancient times to the Middle Ages primarily by multiple Chinese dynasties, with substantial derivation from the Tang Dynasty, and to a lesser extent by other Asian countries. For example, one of the scripts for writing in the Japanese language is Chinese characters (kanji), but Japanese has no genetic relationship with Chinese. Since the Meiji era Japan has been primarily influenced by western countries.

The inhabitants of Japan experienced a long period of relative isolation from the outside world for over 220 years during the Tokugawa shogunate until the arrival of the "Black Ships" and the Meiji era.

Today, the culture of Japan stands as one of the most influential cultures around the world, mainly because of the global reach of its popular culture.
In 2021, U.S. News & World Report ranked Japan's cultural influence as the highest in Asia and 5th worldwide.

Language 

Japanese is the national and primary language of Japan. Japanese has a lexically distinct pitch-accent system. Early Japanese is known largely on the basis of its state in the 8th century when the three major works of Old Japanese were compiled. The earliest attestation of the Japanese language is in a Chinese document from 256 AD. The Japanese language has no genetic relationship with Chinese, but neither does it have any clear affiliation with any other language.

There are a number of theories about the origins of Japanese, but the strongest arguments for affiliation are with Korean, on the basis of similar syntax, and with Altaic languages, on the basis of similar number systems and verb forms.

Japanese is written with a combination of three scripts: kanji, hiragana and katakana. In the present day, there is a notable number of kanji in modern Japanese with a different meaning from the corresponding  character used in modern Chinese. Modern Japanese also features far fewer simplified Chinese characters in comparison to modern Chinese; Japanese people typically use fewer kanji in general and use them mainly for nouns, adjective stems, and verb stems.

Japanese vocabulary consists of 49% words of Chinese origin, 33% words of Japanese origin, and 18% loanwords from other languages, which include European languages, words of mixed origin and the made-in-Japan pseudo-English known as wasei-eigo.

Both hiragana and katakana are phonetic syllabaries derived from the Chinese  of the 5th century. Hiragana and katakana were developed from simplified kanji; hiragana emerged somewhere around the 9th century and were mainly used by women for informal language, with katakana mainly used by men for formal language. By the 10th century, both were commonly used by everyone.

The Latin alphabet is often used in modern Japanese, especially for company names and logos, advertising, and when inputting Japanese into a computer. The Hindu–Arabic numerals are generally used for numbers, but traditional Sino–Japanese numerals are common.

The influence of Japanese culture on the Western world over the past few centuries has led to many of its terms, such as origami, tsunami, karaoke and pop cultural terms like shonen and shojo, being incorporated into the English language, as well as being added to the Oxford English Dictionary.

Religion

Shinto and Buddhism are the primary religions of Japan. According to the annual statistical research on religion in 2018 by the Government of Japan's Agency for Culture Affairs, 66.7 percent of the population practices  Buddhism, 69.0 percent practices Shintoism, 7.7 percent other religions. Minority Christian and Islamic communities exist. According to the annual statistical research on religion in 2018 by the Agency for Culture Affairs, Government of Japan, about two million or slightly 1.5% of Japan's population are Christians. Muslims (70,000) are made up of largely immigrant communities, as well as, though much smaller, the ethnic Japanese community.

Shinto

Shinto is an ethnic religion focusing on ceremonies and rituals. In Shinto, followers believe that  – Shinto deities or spirits – are present throughout nature, including rocks, trees, and mountains. The religion developed in Japan prior to the 6th century CE, after which point followers built shrines to worship .

Buddhism

Buddhism developed in India around the 6th and 4th centuries BCE and eventually spread through China and Korea. It arrived in Japan during the 6th century CE, where it was initially unpopular. Most Japanese people were unable to understand the difficult philosophical messages present in Buddhism; however, an appreciation for the religion's art is believed to have led to Buddhism later growing in popularity.

Buddhism is concerned with the cycle of rebirth and karma.

National character

The Japanese "national character" has been written about under the term , literally meaning "theories/discussions about the Japanese people" and referring to texts on matters that are normally the concerns of sociology, psychology, history, linguistics, and philosophy, but emphasizing the authors' assumptions or perceptions of Japanese exceptionalism; these are predominantly written in Japan by Japanese people, though noted examples have also been written by foreign residents, journalists and even scholars.

Literature

Early works of Japanese literature were heavily influenced by cultural contact with China and Chinese literature, often written in Classical Chinese. Eventually, Japanese literature developed into a separate style in its own right as Japanese writers began writing their own works about Japan. The Tale of Genji, written by Murasaki Shikibu during the Heian period, is known worldwide as a unique Japanese literature. Since Japan reopened its ports to Western trading and diplomacy in the 19th century, Western and Eastern literature have strongly affected each other and continue to do so.

Visual arts 

Japanese calligraphy, rendered using flowing, brush-drawn strokes, is considered to be a traditional art form, as well as a means of conveying written information. Typical calligraphic works can consist of phrases, poems, stories, or even characters represented by themselves; the style and format of the calligraphy can mimic the subject matter through aspects such as the texture of the writing and the speed of the brush strokes. Several different styles of Japanese calligraphy exist, with considerable effort put into the outcome; in some cases, it can take over one hundred attempts to produce the desired result of a single character.

Painting has been an art in Japan for a very long time: the brush is a traditional writing and painting tool, and the extension of that to its use as an artist's tool was probably natural. Japanese painters are often categorized by what they painted, as most of them constrained themselves solely to subjects such as animals, landscapes, or figures. Chinese papermaking was introduced to Japan around the 7th century. Later,  was developed from it. Native Japanese painting techniques are still in use today, as well as techniques adopted from continental Asia and from the West. Schools of painting such as the Kano school of the 16th century became known for their bold brush strokes and contrast between light and dark, especially after Oda Nobunaga and Tokugawa Ieyasu began to use this style. Famous Japanese painters include Kanō Sanraku, Maruyama Ōkyo, and Tani Bunchō.

, literally "pictures of the floating world", is a genre of woodblock prints that exemplifies the characteristics of pre-Meiji Japanese art. Because these prints could be mass-produced, they were available to a wide cross-section of the Japanese populace — those not wealthy enough to afford original paintings — during their heyday, from the 17th to 20th century.

Japanese lacquerware and ceramics have historically gained international fame, and lacquerware has been actively exported since the Muromachi period and ceramics since the Edo period. Japanese crafts became known in Europe after Nanban trade.

 is the Japanese art of flower arrangement. It has gained widespread international fame for its focus on harmony, color use, rhythm, and elegantly simple design. It is an art centered greatly on expressing the seasons and is meant to act as a symbol to something greater than the flower itself.

Traditional clothing

The kimono is the national garment of Japan, having developed from Chinese court clothing in the Nara period (Tang dynasty China) following the exchange of diplomatic envoys between the two countries at that time.

This influence was spread through Japanese envoy missions to China, resulting in extensive Chinese cultural adoption by Japan as early as the 5th century AD. It was during the 8th century, however, that Chinese fashions came fully into style, and following the cancellation of the 20th mission to Tang dynasty China, these fashions developed independently, with the overlapping, V-shaped collar becoming women's fashion and the precursor to the modern kimono.

Kimono come in a variety of colors, styles, and sizes. Men mainly wear darker or more muted colors, while women tend to wear brighter colors and pastels, and, especially for younger women, often with complicated abstract or floral patterns.

In previous decades, married women wore short sleeved kimono, whereas unmarried women wore long sleeved kimono to both formal and informal occasions; however, the rise in both the average age of marriage and the numbers of women never marrying in Japan has led to the divide between sleeve length becoming one more of age, with most women in their early twenties wearing long sleeved kimono only to formal occasions, and most women past their early twenties wearing short sleeved kimono to formal events.

The  coat is another form of traditional clothing. A  (commonly Westernised as "happy") coat is a straight sleeved coat typically decorated with a family crest and/or kanji along the collar.

Installation arts

Japanese architecture was originally heavily influenced by Chinese architecture and later developed many unique aspects indigenous to Japan. Examples of traditional architecture are seen at temples, Shinto shrines, and castles in Kyoto and Nara. Some of these buildings are constructed with traditional gardens, which are influenced by Zen ideas. Some modern architects, such as Yoshio Taniguchi and Tadao Ando are known for their amalgamation of Japanese traditional and Western architectural influences.

Traditional Japanese garden architecture is considered to hold the same importance as traditional building architecture, and both are influenced by similar historical and religious backgrounds.

Traditional Japanese sculptures mainly focused on Buddhist images, such as Tathagata, Bodhisattva, and Myō-ō. The oldest sculpture in Japan is a wooden statue of Amitābha at the Zenkō-ji temple. In the Nara period, Buddhist statues were made by the national government to boost its prestige. These examples are seen in present-day Nara and Kyoto, most notably a colossal bronze statue of the Buddha Vairocana in the Tōdai-ji temple.

Wood has traditionally been used as the chief material in Japan, along with traditional Japanese architecture. Statues are often lacquered, gilded, or brightly painted, although there are commonly few traces of this on the surface. Bronze and other metals are generally not used. Other materials, such as stone and pottery, have had extremely important roles in traditional sculpture.

Music

The music of Japan includes a wide array of performers in distinct styles both traditional and modern. Japan is the second largest music market in the world behind the United States, and is the largest in Asia, with most of the market dominated by Japanese artists.

Local music often appears at karaoke venues on lease from record labels. Traditional Japanese music is quite different from Western Music and is based on the intervals of human breathing rather than mathematical timing; traditional music also typically slides between notes, a feature also not commonly found in Western music.

Performing arts

Among the characteristic aspects of it are the masks, costumes, and the stylized gestures, sometimes accompanied by a fan that can represent other objects.

In , masks are rarely used and even if the plays can be associated with the ones of noh, currently many are not.

Kabuki appears in the beginning of the Edo period from the representations and dances of Izumo no Okuni in Kyoto. Due to concerns over the number of actresses engaged in selling sex, the participation of women in the plays was forbidden by the government in 1629, and the feminine characters had passed to be represented only by men. Recent attempts to reintroduce actresses in kabuki had not been well accepted. Another characteristic of kabuki is the use of makeup for the actors in historical plays and the performance of  ballads.

Japanese puppet theater developed in the same period as kabuki, in both competition with and collaboration with its actors and authors. In 1914, the Takarazuka Revue was founded, a company solely composed by women who introduced the revue to Japan.

Sports and leisure

Examples include , and sumo, all of which were established in the Edo period. After the rapid social change in the Meiji Restoration, some martial arts changed into modern sports, called . Judo was developed by Kanō Jigorō, who studied some sects of jujutsu. These sports are still widely practiced in present-day Japan and other countries.

Baseball, Association football, and other popular western sports were imported to Japan in the Meiji period. These sports are commonly practiced in schools, along with traditional martial arts. Baseball, soccer, football, and ping pong are the most popular sports in Japan. Association football gained prominence in Japan after the J League (Japan Professional Football League) was established in 1991. Japan also co-hosted the 2002 FIFA World Cup. In addition, there are many semi-professional organizations, which are sponsored by private companies: for example, volleyball, basketball, rugby union, table tennis, and so on.

Cuisine

Through a long culinary past, the Japanese have developed sophisticated and refined cuisine. In more recent years, Japanese food has become fashionable and popular in the United States, Europe, and many other areas. Dishes such as sushi, tempura, noodles, and teriyaki are some of the foods that are commonly known. The Japanese diet consists principally of rice; fresh, lean seafood; and pickled or boiled vegetables. The Japanese diet is often believed to be related to the longevity of Japanese people.

Popular culture

Japanese popular culture not only reflects the attitudes and concerns of the present day but also provides a link to the past. Popular films, television programs, manga, music, anime and video games all developed from older artistic and literary traditions, and many of their themes and styles of presentation can be traced to traditional art forms. Contemporary forms of popular culture, much like the traditional forms, provide not only entertainment but also an escape for the contemporary Japanese from the problems of an industrial world. Many anime and manga are very popular around the world and continue to become popular, as well as Japanese video games, fashion, and game shows.

In the late 1980s, the family was the focus of leisure activities, such as excursions to parks or shopping districts. Although Japan is often thought of as a hard-working society with little time for leisure, the Japanese seek entertainment wherever they can. It is common to see Japanese commuters riding the train to work, enjoying their favorite manga, or listening through earphones to the latest in popular music. A wide variety of types of popular entertainment are available. There is a large selection of music, films, and the products of a huge manga and anime industry, among other forms of entertainment, from which to choose. Together, the publishing, film/video, music/audio, and game industries in Japan make up the growing Japanese content industry.

Cultural landscapes

There are 51 official  in Japan. These landscapes evolved with the way of life and geocultural features of a region, and which are indispensable for understanding the lifestyle of the Japanese people.

The  is the canonical list of Japan's three most celebrated scenic sights, attributed to 1643 scholar Hayashi Gahō. These are the pine-clad islands of Matsushima in Miyagi Prefecture, the pine-clad sandbar of Amanohashidate in Kyoto Prefecture, and Itsukushima Shrine in Hiroshima Prefecture.

National symbols

The Japanese archipelago is located to the east of the Asian continent. Japan is regarded as the most eastern Asian country, because east of Japan is the vast Pacific Ocean. Minamitorishima is Japan's easternmost island. Thus Japan is the land where the sun rises before the Asian continent. The kanji that make up the name of Japan literally mean . The  is the national flag of Japan. It symbolizes the rising sun and corresponds with the name of Japan. The earliest accounts of the rising sun flag is in the 7th century CE. In 607, an official correspondence that began with "from the Emperor of the rising sun" was sent to Chinese Emperor Yang of Sui. Thus the central importance of the sun in Japanese culture is represented in the national flag and other cultural goods. Similarly, the Japan Self-Defense Forces have flags that symbolize the sun.

The Sun also plays an important role in Japanese mythology and religion as the emperor is said to be the direct descendant of the Sun goddess Amaterasu, the personification of Japan. She is seen as the goddess of the Sun and the universe in Shinto religion. The emperor is "the symbol of the State and of the unity of the people."  is the national founder of Japan.

The national animals are the green pheasant, koi fish and the great purple emperor butterfly. The Imperial Seal of Japan is one of the national seals and a crest used by the Emperor of Japan and members of the Imperial Family. The cherry blossom (Prunus serrulata) & chrysanthemum morifolium are de facto national flowers of Japan. Japan's de facto national dish is sushi, Japanese curry and ramen.

 is the national mountain of Japan. It is one of Japan's  along with Mount Tate and Mount Haku. It is also a Special Place of Scenic Beauty and one of Japan's Historic Sites. The summit is considered a sacred place since ancient times. As a national symbol of the country, Mount Fuji has been depicted in various art and media such as painting, woodblock prints (such as the Thirty-six Views of Mount Fuji), poetry, music, theater, film, manga, anime and pottery.

Gallery

See also

 Cool Japan
 History of Japan
 National symbols of Japan
 Imperial House of Japan
 Tourism in Japan
 Japanese language
 Etiquette in Japan
 Religion in Japan
 Japanese cuisine
 Japanese aesthetics
 Japanese music
 Japanese performing arts
 Science and technology in Japan
 Japanese martial arts

References
  Review
 Japan 
 
 
 
 
 Varley, Paul. Japanese Culture. 4th Edition. Honolulu. 2000.

Notes

Further reading
 Japan Unbound: A Volatile Nation's Quest for Pride and Purpose
 The Chrysanthemum and the Sword

External links

 Japanese-City.com Japanese Cultural Events by Japanese Organizations throughout America.
 The History of Japanese Calligraphy In English, at BeyondCalligraphy.com
 Japan Society – New York City North America's single major producer of high-quality content on Japan for an English-speaking audience.
 Agency for Cultural Affairs
 Traditional Culture – The Imperial Household Agency
 "Working with the Japanese," BBC
 Rare Materials Exhibition – Kyoto University Digital Library(貴重資料画像--京都大学電子図書館) Image files of rare materials related to culture of Japan
 How The People of Japan See Anime Culture .
 Japanese Architecture and Art Net Users System
 Web Japan

 

kk:Жапон өнері